Ângela Moraes (born 15 October 1972) is a Brazilian female volleyball player, who played as a middle blocker.

She was part of the Brazil women's national volleyball team at the 1999 FIVB Volleyball Women's World Cup, 2002 FIVB Volleyball Women's World Championship in Germany.

On club level she played with Minas Tênis Clube.

Clubs

References

External links 
 player info FIVB
http://wvbfprotour.blogspot.com/
http://www.melhordovolei.com.br/por-onde-anda-angela-moraes-ex-jogadora-de-pinheiros-minas-e-da-selecao-brasileira/

1979 births
Living people
Brazilian women's volleyball players
Place of birth missing (living people)
Middle blockers